Elizabeth Folan Gilpin (born July 21, 1986) is an American actress. She is best known for portraying Debbie "Liberty Belle" Eagan in the Netflix comedy series GLOW (2017–2019), for which she was nominated for three Primetime Emmy Awards for Outstanding Supporting Actress in a Comedy Series. She also starred as Dr. Carrie Roman in the Showtime comedy-drama series Nurse Jackie (2013–2015).

Gilpin has appeared in films such as the mystery thriller True Story (2015), the science fiction romantic comedy Future '38 (2017), the fantasy romantic comedy Isn't It Romantic (2019), the drama A Dog's Journey (2019), and the action comedy Stuber (2019). In 2020, Gilpin starred in the horror film The Grudge, the satirical action thriller The Hunt, and the action comedy Coffee & Kareem. For The Hunt, she won a Critics' Choice Super Award for Best Actress in an Action Movie.

Early life
Elizabeth Folan Gilpin was born in New York City on July 21, 1986, the daughter of actors Jack Gilpin and Ann McDonough. Her father, also an Episcopal priest, is a first cousin of Drew Gilpin Faust, the president of Harvard University from 2007 to 2018. She grew up in the South Street Seaport neighborhood of Manhattan, where she says that her family home was "one of the only occupied buildings on the block." Gilpin is a 2004 graduate of The Loomis Chaffee School, and a 2008 graduate of Fordham University. During her time at Fordham, she studied under Dianne Wiest.

Career
Gilpin began her acting career with guest starring roles in numerous television series, including Law & Order: Criminal Intent, Fringe, Medium, Law & Order: Special Victims Unit, and Elementary. She received further recognition for her starring role as Dr. Carrie Roman in the comedy-drama series Nurse Jackie, appearing from 2013 to the series' conclusion in 2015. She has also appeared off-Broadway in productions such as Heartless, I'm Gonna Pray for You So Hard, and We Live Here.

Gilpin had supporting roles in such films as Ghost Town (2008), Take Care (2014), True Story (2015), and Future '38 (2017), but her breakthrough came with her starring role as Debbie "Liberty Belle" Eagan in the Netflix comedy series GLOW (2017–2019), which was inspired by the 1980s female professional wrestling league of the same name. She received significant critical acclaim and numerous award nominations for her performance, including two Critics' Choice Television Award for Best Supporting Actress in a Comedy Series and three Primetime Emmy Awards for Outstanding Supporting Actress in a Comedy Series. Between 2019 and 2020, Gilpin appeared in the fantasy romantic comedy film Isn't It Romantic, the comedy-drama film A Dog's Journey, the action comedy film Stuber, and the action horror film The Hunt. In 2021, she appeared in the science fiction action movie, The Tomorrow War. In the same year, Gilpin was set to star in the upcoming HBO series Blood Sugar. In 2022, Betty appeared as Mo Dean in the political thriller limited series Gaslit. She received recognition for her role with a nomination for the Critics' Choice Television Award for Best Supporting Actress in a Limited Series or Movie Made for Television.

In September 2022, Betty published her first book, a collection of 20 essays titled All the Women in My Brain: And Other Concerns.

Personal life 
Gilpin has been married to actor Cosmo Pfeil since 2016. She gave birth to the couple’s daughter in November 2020.

Filmography

Film

Television

Awards and nominations

References

External links

1986 births
Living people
21st-century American actresses
Actresses from New York City
American stage actresses
American television actresses
Fordham University alumni
Loomis Chaffee School alumni